Sungei Bedok MRT station is a future underground Mass Rapid Transit interchange and terminal station on the Downtown line and Thomson–East Coast line in Bedok planning area, Singapore. The station is being built east of where Upper East Coast Road becomes Bedok Road, and will serve residents of the Eastwood estate. Nearby facilities include the Bedok Food Centre, Eastwood Centre and the Laguna National Golf & Country Club.

The station is named after Sungei Bedok, a small river within its vicinity. Despite its name and location, the station is not contiguous to either Bedok North or Bedok Reservoir stations of the Downtown line.

History
This station was first announced on 15 August 2014 as part of the Downtown line stage 3e, consisting of 2 stations between Xilin and Sungei Bedok, and the Thomson–East Coast line phase 5, also consisting of 2 stations between Bedok South and Sungei Bedok MRT. It was expected to be completed in 2024, in tandem with the adjacent East Coast Integrated Depot. However, due to the COVID-19 pandemic, this station is now expected to commence passenger service in 2025 instead.

While serving as the future eastern terminus of the Downtown line, it will also serve as the eastern terminus of the Thomson–East Coast line until 2040, which will be extended to Changi Airport Terminal 5 and existing Changi Airport stations, before terminating at Tanah Merah.

Contract T312 for the design and construction of Sungei Bedok Station and associated tunnels was awarded to KTC Civil Engineering & Construction Pte Ltd at a sum of S$418 million in June 2016. Construction began in 2016.

References

External links

Proposed railway stations in Singapore
Mass Rapid Transit (Singapore) stations
Railway stations scheduled to open in 2025